The Norwegian Union of Shoe Makers was a trade union representing workers in the shoe manufacturing industry in Norway.

The union was founded in 1890, and affiliated to the Norwegian Confederation of Trade Unions.  By 1963, it had 3,833 members.  In 1969, it merged with the Norwegian Union of Clothing Workers and the Norwegian Union of Textile Workers, forming the Garment Workers' Union.

Presidents
1890: L. A. Frøitland
1902: M. A. Bakke
1904: A. E. Gundersen
1938: Anton Andresen
1955: Ingvald Hansen

Further reading

References

Defunct trade unions of Norway
Norwegian Confederation of Trade Unions
Trade unions established in 1890
Trade unions disestablished in 1969
Footwear industry trade unions